Ocean was a sloop launched in 1790 at Plymouth. Circa 1792 the Sierra Leone Company purchased her and sailed her in support of their colony. In 1793 the Company sent her on a voyage along the coast to trade for African commodities that she brought back to Freetown for re-export. The Company judged the experiment a success and the next year it sent several more vessels to do the same. The French captured Ocean in August 1796 and the Royal Navy recaptured her in January 1798. Her subsequent fate is obscure.

Career
Ocean first appeared in Lloyd's Register (LR) in 1791.

In October 1793, the company sent Ocean to cruise from Bissau to Cape Mesurado. Her mission was to visit the forts on the way to purchase African commodities and bring them back to Freetown. There the company would warehouse them until it could export them on vessels visiting Freetown. 

The trial apparently was a success. In April 1794 the company expanded the program.

 Domingo sailed to the River Gabon to acquire wax, ivory, and redwood
  sailed to the Gold Coast to trade in gold and ivory
 James and William carried rum and rice to the Gold Coast
 Amy sailed to São Tomé to gather "useful plants and seeds"
 Duke of Clarence was stationed at Rio Pongas as a factory
 The company also employed a small vessel as a packet to ferry goods and mail back to Freetown

In August 1796, the French privateers Africane and Carmagnole captured Ocean, Macaulay, master, off the coast of Africa. The report stated that they had also captured Speedwell, Payne, master, Manchester, Kendall, master, and Atlantic, Rae, master.

Macaulay was the brother of the governor of the Sierra Leone settlement, Zachary Macaulay. The news of the capture of the vessels, including Ocean, reached the governor at Freetown on 3 September. A few days later Macaulay's brother arrived at Freetown, together with the letters he had been carrying when taken, and a letter from the captain of Africain. An American trader in enslaved people named McLeod, purchased Ocean at Gorée.

In late 1797 or early 1798  and  captured six French vessels off Gorée: Two of these were
 Ship , which was trading on the coast and had a cargo of merchandise and 337 captives.
 Sloop Ocean, which had belonged to the Sierra Leone Company. She was carrying cloth, iron, beads, and ten captives.

Daedalus and Hornet, were working with the letter of marque slave ships  and St Anne to find and defeat "Renaud's Squadron". They shared by agreement in the proceeds of the recapture of Quaker (December 1797) and Ocean (January 1798).

The disposition of Ocean after her recapture is obscure. Ocean was no longer listed in Lloyd's Register in 1798.

Notes

Citations

References
 
 
 
  

1790 ships
Age of Sail merchant ships of England
Captured ships